John Harris (born 28 May 1938) is a British sprint canoer who competed in the early 1960s. He was eliminated in the repechages of the K-2 1000 m event at the 1960 Summer Olympics in Rome.

After his career as a canoeist, John Harris attended Birmingham University where he qualified as a doctor. He practiced as a GP for many years before retiring in his 70s. 
Dr John Harris married and had 3 children.

References
Sports-reference.com profile

1938 births
Canoeists at the 1960 Summer Olympics
Living people
Olympic canoeists of Great Britain
British male canoeists